
Lac de l'Hongrin is a reservoir in Vaud, Switzerland. The two arch dams Hongrin Nord and Hongrin Sud were completed in 1969. The Dam helps with hydro electricity, and stops flooding in the area.

The water of the Hongrin reservoir is used for the Veytaux Pumped Storage Power Station. This power station has currently a nameplate capacity of 240 megawatts. Additional turbines which will double capacity to 480 MW will be commissioned by end of 2015.

See also
List of lakes of Switzerland
List of mountain lakes of Switzerland

References

External links 

Lakes of the canton of Vaud
Arch dams
Reservoirs in Switzerland
RLacdelHongrin